This is a list of members of the Australian Capital Territory Legislative Assembly, as elected at 16 October 2004 election.

 Molonglo Labor MLA Ted Quinlan resigned on 21 March 2006. Andrew Barr was elected as his replacement on a countback on 3 April  
 Molonglo MLA Richard Mulcahy was expelled from the Liberal Party on 10 December 2007. Mulcahy served as an independent until August 2008, when he formed the Richard Mulcahy Canberra Party to contest the 2008 election.

See also
2004 Australian Capital Territory general election

Members of Australian Capital Territory parliaments by term
21st-century Australian politicians